Obernheim is a municipality of the Zollernalbkreis district of Baden-Württemberg, Germany.

History
Obernheim grew and industrialized after the Second World War, first expanding in the 1950s to the north-east and west, and then in the 1970s to the north once more. There was further municipal growth to the northeast in the 1980s and 1990s.

Geography
The municipality (Gemeinde) of Obernheimof is located along the southern edge Zollernalb district of Baden-Württemberg, one of the Federal Republic of Germany's 16 States. Elevation above sea level ranges in the municipality from a high of  Normalnull (NN) to a low of  NN.

A portion of the Federally-protected  nature reserve is located in Obernheim's municipal area.

Coat of arms
Obernheim's coat of arms is a field of white crossed by a single blue bar. This pattern was adapted from the personal blazon of Johann von Obernheim, a local 14th century nobleman, and was approved for official use by the provisional post-WWII Württemberg-Hohenzollern government on 27 October 1950. A corresponding flag was issued on 15 January 1982.

Transportation
Obernheim was connected to the Heuberg Railway until its station was closed in 1996.

References

External links
  (in German)

Württemberg